Lake Township is a civil township of Menominee County in the U.S. state of Michigan. The population was 576 at the 2000 census.

Geography

Demographics
As of the census of 2000, there were 576 people, 244 households, and 164 families residing in the township.  The population density was 8.1 per square mile (3.1/km2).  There were 566 housing units at an average density of 8.0 per square mile (3.1/km2).  The racial makeup of the township was 97.92% White, 0.69% Native American, 0.52% Asian, and 0.87% from two or more races.

There were 244 households, out of which 24.6% had children under the age of 18 living with them, 61.9% were married couples living together, 2.0% had a female householder with no husband present, and 32.4% were non-families. 27.5% of all households were made up of individuals, and 10.7% had someone living alone who was 65 years of age or older.  The average household size was 2.27 and the average family size was 2.72.

In the township the population was spread out, with 20.0% under the age of 18, 6.1% from 18 to 24, 26.7% from 25 to 44, 30.6% from 45 to 64, and 16.7% who were 65 years of age or older.  The median age was 44 years. For every 100 females, there were 117.4 males.  For every 100 females age 18 and over, there were 108.6 males.

The median income for a household in the township was $35,446, and the median income for a family was $38,875. Males had a median income of $28,875 versus $20,972 for females. The per capita income for the township was $17,244.  About 4.7% of families and 9.8% of the population were below the poverty line, including 3.4% of those under age 18 and 10.4% of those age 65 or over.

References

Townships in Menominee County, Michigan
Marinette micropolitan area
Townships in Michigan